The 1978–79 NBA season was the Rockets' 12th season in the NBA and 8th season in the city of Houston.

In the playoffs, the Rockets were swept by the Atlanta Hawks in two games in the First Round.

Roster

Regular season

Season standings

z – clinched division title
y – clinched division title
x – clinched playoff spot

Record vs. opponents

Playoffs

|- align="center" bgcolor="#ffcccc"
| 1
| April 11
| Atlanta
| L 106–109
| Moses Malone (28)
| Moses Malone (17)
| Slick Watts (7)
| The Summit14,405
| 0–1
|- align="center" bgcolor="#ffcccc"
| 2
| April 13
| @ Atlanta
| L 91–100
| Moses Malone (21)
| Moses Malone (24)
| Calvin Murphy (4)
| Omni Coliseum15,798
| 0–2
|-

Awards and records
Moses Malone, NBA Most Valuable Player Award
Moses Malone, All-NBA First Team
Moses Malone, NBA All-Defensive Second Team

References

Houston Rockets seasons
Houston